
Gmina Żegocina is a rural gmina (administrative district) in Bochnia County, Lesser Poland Voivodeship, in southern Poland.

Villages
Gmina Żegocina is made up of the sołectwos of the villages of Bełdno, Bytomsko, Łąkta Górna, Rozdziele and Żegocina.

Neighbouring gminas
Gmina Żegocina is bordered by the town of Bochnia and by the gminas of Laskowa, Lipnica Murowana, Nowy Wiśnicz and Trzciana.

References

Zegocina
Bochnia County